Grace Street may refer to:

Places
Grace Street Commercial Historic District, national historic district located in Richmond, Virginia
Grace Street, Alta Vista Terrace District, Chicago
Grace Street, Italian Walk of Fame, Toronto
Grace Street, Jack & Newell General Store, Herberton, Queensland, Australia.
Grace Street, Cedar Hill (New Haven)
Grace Street line to Delaware Street, 1895 Syracuse Consolidated Street Railway

Entertainment
Grace Street (Big Wreck album), Canadian album
"Grace Street", song by Tom Rapp from Familiar Songs 1972

See also
Nightmare on Grace Street, a 2005 album by Ten 33
"Nightmare on Grace Street", a 2011 episode of The Cleveland Show